Rosa Eva Díaz Tezanos (born 12 June 1964) is a Spanish politician from the Spanish Socialist Workers' Party who served as Vice President of Cantabria and Regional Minister of Universities, Research, Environment and Social Policy from 2015 to 2019.

References

1968 births
Politicians from Cantabria
Spanish Socialist Workers' Party politicians
Living people